Manuel Diego Tello Jorge (born 16 February 1984 in Madrid) is a Spanish footballer who plays for CDA Navalcarnero as a midfielder.

Honours
Spain U20
FIFA U-20 World Cup: Runner-up 2003

External links

1984 births
Living people
Footballers from Madrid
Spanish footballers
Association football midfielders
Segunda División players
Segunda División B players
Tercera División players
Real Madrid C footballers
Real Madrid Castilla footballers
Levante UD footballers
Atlético Levante UD players
CDA Navalcarnero players
Getafe CF B players
RSD Alcalá players
CD Guadalajara (Spain) footballers
CF Fuenlabrada footballers
Internacional de Madrid players
Spain youth international footballers
Spain under-21 international footballers